Love Letters is the fourth studio album by English electronic music band Metronomy, released on 10 March 2014 by Because Music. It peaked at number seven on the UK Albums Chart, becoming the band's highest-charting album to date.

Reception

Love Letters received mostly positive reviews from music critics. According to critic review aggregator Metacritic, the album has received a score of 73 out of 100, based on 26 reviews, indicating "generally favorable reviews". Heather Phares of AllMusic writes that "Musically and emotionally, Love Letters is rawer than what came before it, trading breezy synth pop for insistent psych-rock and soul influences. Confessional and insular, Love Letters is the work of a band willing to take pop success on their own terms and reveal a different – but just as appealing – side of their artistry in the process".

Track listing

Personnel
Credits adapted from the liner notes of Love Letters.

Metronomy
 Joseph Mount – vocals, guitar, drums, bass
 Olugbenga Adelekan – bass
 Anna Prior – drums
 Michael Lovett – keyboards
 Oscar Cash – piano, keyboards

Additional musicians
 Gabriel Stebbing – acoustic guitar 
 Luke Oldfield – electric guitar 
 The Proper Ornaments – guitar 

 Airelle Besson, Daniel Zimmermann, Thomas Depourquery – horns (arranged by Airelle Besson)
 HowAboutBeth, Jaelee Small, Kenzie May Bryant – backing vocals

Technical
 Joseph Mount – production
 Ash Workman – co-production, engineering, mixing
 Luke Oldfield – engineering, tape operation

Artwork
 Leslie David – artwork, art direction

Charts

Weekly charts

Year-end charts

In 2014, the album was certified Gold by the Independent Music Companies Association (IMPALA), denoting sales in excess of 75,000 copies across Europe.

References

2014 albums
Metronomy albums